My Divine Poverty (Spanish: Mi divina pobreza) is a 1951 Argentine drama film directed by Alberto D'Aversa and starring Elina Colomer and Armando Bó.

Cast
Elina Colomer
Armando Bó
Rafael Frontaura
Julián Bourges
María Esther Corán
Juan Carlos Prevende
Carlos Barbetti
Raúl Roa
Manuel Alcón
José Guisone

References

Bibliography
 César Maranghello. Breve historia del cine argentino. Celesa, 2005.

External links
 

1951 films
1950s Spanish-language films
Argentine black-and-white films
Films directed by Alberto D'Aversa
Argentine drama films
1951 drama films
1950s Argentine films